Elk Creek is a census-designated place in Glenn County, California.

The 2010 census reported that Elk Creek's population was 163. It is home to the smallest public high school in California, which has an enrollment of about 35 students in grades 7 through 12. The Grindstone Indian Rancheria of Wintun-Wailaki Indians, founded in 1907, is located approximately seven miles north of the town and conducts business in Elk Creek. The best-known landmark nearby is a mountain named Bidwell Point.

The first post office at Elk Creek opened in 1872.

The town of Elk Creek is just north of Stony Gorge Reservoir. Elk Creek, the town's namesake, runs out of the Coast Range mountains to the east into Stony Creek. Stony Creek runs from the dam at Stony Gorge into another lake a bit further up the map called Black Butte Lake. Hunting is restricted to shotguns and bows.

Demographics

The 2010 United States Census reported that Elk Creek had a population of 163. The racial makeup of Elk Creek was 144 (88.3%) White, 0 (0.0%) African American, 7 (4.3%) Native American, 1 (0.6%) Asian, 0 (0.0%) Pacific Islander, 8 (4.9%) from other races, and 3 (1.8%) from two or more races. Hispanic or Latino of any race were 8 persons (4.9%).

The Census reported that 163 people (100% of the population) lived in households, 0 (0%) lived in non-institutionalized group quarters, and 0 (0%) were institutionalized.

There were 73 households, out of which 16 (21.9%) had children under the age of 18 living in them, 40 (54.8%) were opposite-sex married couples living together, 5 (6.8%) had a female householder with no husband present, 6 (8.2%) had a male householder with no wife present.  There were 3 (4.1%) unmarried opposite-sex partnerships, and 1 (1.4%) same-sex married couples or partnerships. 20 households (27.4%) were made up of individuals, and 8 (11.0%) had someone living alone who was 65 years of age or older. The average household size was 2.23.  There were 51 families (69.9% of all households); the average family size was 2.65.

The population was spread out, with 25 people (15.3%) under the age of 18, 7 people (4.3%) aged 18 to 24, 21 people (12.9%) aged 25 to 44, 67 people (41.1%) aged 45 to 64, and 43 people (26.4%) who were 65 years of age or older.  The median age was 52.5 years. For every 100 females, there were 101.2 males.  For every 100 females age 18 and over, there were 97.1 males.

The homeowner vacancy rate was 3.3%; the rental vacancy rate was 0%.  129 people (79.1% of the population) lived in owner-occupied housing units and 34 people (20.9%) lived in rental housing units.

Climate
This region experiences hot and dry summers with temperatures reaching up to 115 degrees.

According to the Köppen Climate Classification system, Elk Creek has a hot-summer Mediterranean climate, abbreviated "Csa" on climate maps.

References

Census-designated places in Glenn County, California
Census-designated places in California